Tommie D. Reynolds (born August 15, 1941) is a former Major League Baseball outfielder.  He was signed by the Kansas City Athletics as an amateur free agent in 1963, and played for them from 1963 to 1965.  He also played for the New York Mets (1967), Oakland Athletics (1969), California Angels (1970–1971), and Milwaukee Brewers (1972).

An average defensive outfielder, Reynolds started in almost half of his team's games in both 1965 and 1969, usually in left field.  He was also used quite often as a pinch hitter throughout his career.  His busiest and best season was 1969, when he played in 107 games and made 363 plate appearances for Oakland.  He batted .257 with 2 home runs, 20 RBI, and 51 runs scored.

Career highlights include:   
a pair of 4-hit games...three singles and a double vs. the Cleveland Indians (September 2, 1965), and three singles and a double vs. the Detroit Tigers (August 26, 1969)
eight 3-hit games, with four of them coming in 1970
one 4-RBI game, including a three-run homer against All-Star Mickey Lolich of the Detroit Tigers (April 30, 1964)
a pinch hit home run against All-Star Luis Tiant of the Cleveland Indians (May 30, 1969)
hit a combined .424 (36-for-85) against All-Stars Hank Aguirre, Mickey Lolich, Sam McDowell, and Juan Pizarro

His career totals include 513 games played, 265 hits, 12 home runs, 87 RBI, 141 runs scored, and a lifetime batting average of .226.

After his playing career was over, Reynolds served as a coach for the Oakland Athletics (1989–1995) and the St. Louis Cardinals (1996).

Trivia
Reynolds is a cousin of former major league outfielder Floyd Robinson.
led the Midwest League in batting average (.332) and tied for the league lead in RBI (88) while playing for the Burlington Bees in 1963
was the last strikeout victim of Seattle Pilots right-hander Dick Bates {Sick's Stadium—April 27, 1969}

See also
 List of St. Louis Cardinals coaches

References
1971 Baseball Register published by The Sporting News

External links

Tommie Reynolds at Pura Pelota (Venezuelan Professional Baseball League)

1941 births
African-American baseball coaches
African-American baseball players
Baseball players from Louisiana
Birmingham Barons players
Burlington Bees players
California Angels players
Cardenales de Lara players
American expatriate baseball players in Venezuela
Evansville Triplets players
Florida Instructional League Mets players
Industriales de Valencia players
Iowa Oaks players
Jacksonville Suns players
Kansas City Athletics players
Living people
Major League Baseball outfielders
Major League Baseball third base coaches
Milwaukee Brewers players
Minor league baseball managers
New York Mets players
Oakland Athletics coaches
Oakland Athletics players
Sacramento Solons players
St. Louis Cardinals coaches
Salt Lake City Angels players
Spokane Indians players
Vancouver Mounties players
People from Claiborne Parish, Louisiana
21st-century African-American people
20th-century African-American sportspeople